Rhoetus was a character mentioned by Ovid in Book V of his mock-epic Metamorphoses.
After Perseus rescues Andromeda from the sea monster, her betrothed Phineus, brother of her father, attacks Perseus, throwing a spear at him. Perseus, in turn, throws the spear back, but Phineus hides behind the altars, and the spear strikes Rhoetus.

See also
Boast of Cassiopeia
Rhoetosaurus

Metamorphoses characters
Characters in Greek mythology